Asset Management One Co., Ltd. (アセットマネジメントOne株式会社), abbreviated as AM-One, is a Japanese asset management company. It is a subsidiary of the Mizuho Financial Group and is one of the largest asset management companies in Asia. AM-One acts as one of the investment managers for the Government Pension Investment Fund.

History 
AM-One was formed on October 1, 2016, as a joint venture between Mizuho Financial Group and Dai-ichi Life using the pre-existing asset management units within each company. There were four companies which were merged to create AM-One. They were DIAM Co, Mizuho Asset Management, Shinko Asset Management, and Asset Management Division of Mizuho Trust & Banking.

Currently, Mizuho Financial Group holds 70% of the company's shares and 51% of voting rights while Dai-ichi Life holds 30% of the company's shares and 49% of voting rights.

Business overview 

AM-One's investment product range includes:

 Equities (Both active and passive investment strategies) 
 Fixed Income (Both active and passive investment strategies) 
 Quantitative 
 Alternatives (Including REIT, Commodities and Private Equity)

Its European product range also includes UCITS funds.

AM-One operates various Exchange-traded funds which are listed on the Tokyo Stock Exchange such as " One ETF Nikkei 225" and "One ETF TOPIX" .

The company also acts as one of the investment managers for the Government Pension Investment Fund.

AM-One is headquartered in Tokyo with additional offices in London, New York, Singapore and Hong Kong.

References

External links 

Mizuho Financial Group
Financial services companies established in 2016
Financial services companies based in Tokyo